The Mustinka River is a tributary of Lake Traverse, 68 mi (109 km) long, in western Minnesota in the United States. Via Lake Traverse, the Bois de Sioux River, the Red River of the North, Lake Winnipeg, and the Nelson River, it is part of the watershed of Hudson Bay.

Mustinka is a name derived from the Dakota language meaning "rabbit".

Course
The river turns westwardly in southern Grant County and flows past Norcross into Traverse County, where it turns southwestward past Wheaton. Twelvemile Creek is a tributary of the Mustinka River.

Much of the river's lower course has been straightened and channelized.

See also
List of rivers of Minnesota
List of longest streams of Minnesota

References

Rivers of Minnesota
Rivers of Grant County, Minnesota
Rivers of Otter Tail County, Minnesota
Rivers of Traverse County, Minnesota
Dakota toponyms
Tributaries of Hudson Bay